The New York University Journal of Law & Business is a student-edited law review at New York University School of Law published three times each academic year. It was established in 2004 and is available online. The journal covers a wide range of business law topics, including bankruptcy and restructuring; capital markets and securities; corporate law and governance; foreign and international business law; hedge funds and private equity; and tax.

Membership 
Each year, the journal selects approximately 50 new members through a writing competition that takes place after the conclusion of the first year of law school.

Symposia 
The journal hosts a conference each Fall semester and a symposium each Spring semester.

References

External links 
 

Law journals edited by students
American law journals
New York University academic journals
New York University School of Law
Publications established in 2004
English-language journals
Business law journals
Triannual journals